Catherine Hessling (born Andrée Madeleine Heuschling; 22 June 1900 – 28 September 1979) was a French actress and the first wife of film director Jean Renoir. Hessling appeared in 15, mostly silent, films before retiring from the acting profession and withdrawing from public life in the mid-1930s.

Biography 

Hessling, born in Champagne-Ardennes,  had sought refuge in Nice during World War I. Her paternal ancestors came from Alsace but moved to Champagne-Ardennes when Alsace transferred to Germany. In 1917, her beauty came to the attention of Henri Matisse, who sent her to fellow artist Pierre-Auguste Renoir as he thought she looked like a suitable Renoir subject. Hessling modelled, clothed and nude, for Renoir until his death in December 1919. Renoir's second son, Jean, fell in love with Hessling, and the couple married on 24 January 1920. Hessling gave birth to a son, Alain Renoir, on 31 October 1921.

Jean Renoir had been planning a career in ceramic art but decided instead to try his hand in the medium of film in the attempt, he would later claim, to make Hessling a star. While both were aficionados of American films, and Hessling copied fashions and behaviour she saw on the screen, she had in fact never had any thought or ambition to become an actress herself.

Renoir produced his first script, Catherine, in 1924. Albert Dieudonné would direct the film. Renoir devised for Hessling a very stark, exaggerated look, with the mouth and eyes a penetrating black against white facial make-up, which was again used in his first full-length film The Whirlpool of Fate, and the lavish and costly adaptation of Émile Zola's Nana (1926), in which Hessling's performance has been described as characteristically stylised and unsubtle, yet appropriate for this role.

Hessling appeared in three more Renoir films before the couple separated in 1931. It was rumoured that she had expected to play the role of Lulu in Renoir's sound film La Chienne and felt betrayed when the film's producers insisted on, and Renoir agreed to, another actress (Janie Marèse) in the role. Following the couple's separation (the divorce was not finalised until 1943), Hessling appeared in minor roles in three sound films and had a brief career as a dancer before abandoning show business completely. She lived the rest of her life out of the public eye. 
 
Hessling died in suburban Paris on 28 September 1979, aged 79. Jean Renoir had died in California earlier the same year.

Hessling was played by Christa Théret in the 2012 film Renoir. Set in 1915, the film depicts Hessling's association with Pierre-Auguste Renoir and the beginning of her romantic relationship with Jean Renoir.

Filmography 
1924: Catherine ou Une vie sans Joie (dir. Albert Dieudonné)
1925: The Whirlpool of Fate (dir. Jean Renoir) as Virginia Rosaert
1926: Nana (dir. Jean Renoir) as Nana
1927: Sur un air de Charleston (dir. Jean Renoir) as Catherine Férand
1927: La P'tite Lili (dir. Alberto Cavalcanti)
1927: En rade (dir. Alberto Cavalcanti)
1928: La Petite Marchande d'allumettes (Short, dir. Jean Renoir) as Karen
1928: Tire-au-flanc (dir. Jean Renoir) as L'institutrice (uncredited)
1928: Yvette (dir. Alberto Cavalcanti)
1929: Vous verrez la semaine prochaine (Short, dir. Alberto Cavalcanti)
1930: Le Petit Chaperon rouge (dir. Alberto Cavalcanti) as Le petit Chaperon rouge
1930: Die Jagd nach dem Glück (dir. Rochus Gliese, Carl Koch and  Lotte Reiniger) as Catherine
1933: Du haut en bas (dir. Georg Wilhelm Pabst) as Mademoiselle Paula
1933: Coralie et Cie (dir. Alberto Cavalcanti)
1935: Crime et châtiment (dir. Pierre Chenal) as Elisabeth (final film role)

References

External links
Catherine Hessling at IMDB

1900 births
1979 deaths
French film actresses
French silent film actresses
People from Marne (department)
French people of German descent
French artists' models
20th-century French actresses
Renoir family